St James Gaels or Gaeil Naomh Shéamais in Irish are a Gaelic Athletic Association club located in Dublin, Ireland.

St James Gaels GAA Club was formed in July 1994 as the result of the amalgamation of An Caisleán and Guinness GAA Clubs. Both of these clubs had been in existence for many years but were struggling due to the increasing age profile within their respective base areas. Rather than allow two clubs to go out of existence both sets of club officers agreed, following negotiation, to pool resources with a view to forming one club serving Walkinstown and surrounding areas.

History 
An Caisleán's roots can be traced back to a couple of weeks' after Dublin's victory over Derry in the 1958 All-Ireland Senior Football Championship final. A group of church stewards in Walkinstown Church decided, in the aftermath of Dublin's success, that the newly constituted parish needed its own identity and that a parish GAA Club was an important part in promoting that identity.  With the blessing of the parish clergy they formed CLG Naomh Gearóid (St Gerard's) and went on to become a powerful force in the local community.

The people who set up Naomh Gearóid purchased a site for a club premises and pitch. That site was situated in what is now the Robinhood Industrial Estate on the Long Mile Road (where Heiton/Buckley's Builders Providers is now) however for various reasons, mainly financial, they were forced to resell the property to pay off their debts.

In 1966 the club, who wished to play their games within the parish boundaries, formed an alliance with the Christian Brothers in Drimnagh Castle CBS schools where they were given use of the school pitches and dressing rooms. As part of this alliance the club members agreed to change their name to An Caisleán and became the club for Brothers, pupils and past pupils of the school, almost all of whom lived in Walkinstown parish.

During its twenty-eight years of existence An Caisleán won a number of leagues and championships at various grades. This included winning the Intermediate football league in 1987 and being runners-up in the Dublin Intermediate Football Championship in the same year. Another highlight was the junior hurlers reaching the Dublin Junior Hurling Championship final in 1979.

Guinness GAA Club's history goes back much further than that of An Caisleán. The first club to represent and win in an All-Ireland (1891) for Dublin was a team called Young Irelands. Young Irelands team and officials were all labourers in Guinness's Brewery and in the 1890s they won several All Ireland titles at a time when club champions represented their counties in All Ireland championships.

Young Irelands went out of existence in the early years of the twentieth century and were replaced in the brewery by a club called Phoenix GFC. This club had limited success during their lifetime before they in turn were replaced in the mid-forties by Guinness Hurling and Football Club who based themselves in the Iveagh Grounds.

Guinness GAA Club, whose membership was confined to families and employees of the brewery and its associated companies, ran into difficulties as a result of the rationalising of the brewery operation during the economic downturn in the late 1980s and early 1990s. This rationalisation drastically reduced the intake of staff members of playing age and forced those running the club to consider winding up their operation or merging with another club.

External links 
St James Gaels GAA Club

Gaelic games clubs in Dublin (city)